Grand Forks Boundary Bulletin was a newspaper in Grand Forks, British Columbia.  Published on Monday with a circulation of 5,410.  The paper is no longer in operation.

See also
List of newspapers in Canada

References

Publications with year of establishment missing
Weekly newspapers published in British Columbia
Defunct weekly newspapers
Defunct newspapers published in British Columbia